Babul Ki Galiyaan is a 1972 Hindi drama film directed by S. D. Narang. The film stars Sanjay Khan, Hema Malini and Shatrughan Sinha. The film's music is done by Ravi.

Cast
 Sanjay Khan
 Hema Malini
 Shatrughan Sinha
 Manmohan Krishna
 Tun Tun
 Jagdeep

Soundtrack

References

External links 
 

1972 films
1970s Hindi-language films
Films scored by Ravi
Indian drama films